Over the Moon is a 1997 album by The Verlaines on Columbia Records.  Unlike their previous records, this album was only released in New Zealand and is not well known to their international fans.

Track listing 
All songs written by Graeme Downes.
"Hanging by Strands" - 3:38
"Bonfire" - 3:13
"Sky-Blue Window" - 4:27
"Jailhouse 4.00am" - 4:00
"Feather Fell" - 3:33
"Perfect Day" - 4:09
"When I Fall" - 3:35
"Uncle Big Jaw's Late-Night Farewell" - 2:56
"Dunderhead" - 4:03
"Dawdling on the Bridge" - 3:29
"Writing on the Wall" - 3:39
"Reasons for Leaving" - 5:40
"Coming Back to You" - 4:05

Personnel 
 Graeme Downes - Guitars, vocals, keyboards, oboe, cheap shot cello, mixing
 Darren Stedman - Drums
 Russell Fleming - Bass
 Paul Winders - Guitars, backing vocals
 Stephen Small - Keyboards on "Perfect Day" and "Dawdling on the Bridge"
 Kerrie Winders - Backing vocals on "Reasons for Leaving" and "Dunderhead"
 Tex Houston - Production, engineer
 Nick Rowan - Mixing
 John Collie - photography

Reviews 

 Review at Kiwitapes
 Review by Keith McLachlan at Twee Kitten

References

External links 
 The Verlaines at Trouser Press
 Over the Moon at Allmusic
 Over the Moon at Discogs

1997 albums
The Verlaines albums